Otto L. Burns (September 11, 1868 – December 13, 1941) was an American politician who served as a member of the Wyoming House of Representatives as a Democrat.

Life

Otto L. Burns was born in Des Moines, Iowa on September 11, 1868 to L. D. Burns and Minerva Adams and was educated in public schools. On July 13, 1886 he moved to the Wyoming Territory where he became a rancher and stock raiser. From 1913 to 1915 he served in the Wyoming House of Representatives from one of Albany county's three seats.

On December 13, 1941 he was driving home to Laramie, Wyoming when he was hit by a freight train seven miles north of Laramie and was killed at age 72.

References

External links

1868 births
1941 deaths
20th-century American politicians
Democratic Party members of the Wyoming House of Representatives
People from Laramie, Wyoming
Road incident deaths in Wyoming